Alcohol-related traffic crashes are defined by the United States National Highway Traffic Safety Administration (NHTSA) as alcohol-related if either a driver or a non-motorist had a measurable or estimated BAC of 0.01 g/dl or above.

This statistic includes any and all vehicular (including bicycle and motorcycle) accidents in which any alcohol has been consumed, or believed to have been consumed, by the driver, a passenger or a pedestrian associated with the accident. Thus, if a person who has consumed alcohol and has stopped for a red light is rear-ended by a completely sober but inattentive driver, the accident is listed as alcohol-related, although alcohol had nothing to do with causing the accident. Furthermore, if a sober motorist hits a drunk pedestrian, the accident is also listed as alcohol-related. Alcohol-related accidents are often mistakenly confused with alcohol-caused accidents. Some have criticized the NHTSA for compiling this statistic since it may give the impression that drunk drivers cause a much higher percentage of accidents and does not accurately reflect the problem of drunk driving in the United States.

Nationally, 12.8% of all drivers involved in fatal accidents during 2013 are known to have been intoxicated according to the blood alcohol concentration (BAC laws) of their state. This number is based on a systematic examination of the official records of each and every accident involving a fatality during that year in the US.  However, a majority of fatalities resulting from car accidents involving alcohol are from sober drivers who are hit by drunk drivers.

The higher number (about 40%) commonly reported refers to accidents defined as alcohol-related as estimated by the National Highway Traffic Safety Administration.

Each year, The Century Council, a national non-profit organization funded by a group of alcohol manufacturers, compiles a document of alcohol-related traffic fatalities. Between 1991 and 2013, the rate of alcohol-related traffic fatalities (ARTF) per 100,000 population has decreased 52% nationally, and 79% among youth under 21.

NHTSA data
According to NHTSA, the 50 US states, the District of Columbia, and Puerto Rico all have BAC limits of 0.08 g/dL or lower.

In 2016, in the USA, 10,497 people were killed in crashes involving alcohol-impaired drivers; this represents 28 percent of all traffic-related fatalities. Sixty-two percent of the people killed in such a crash were drivers, 29% occupants, and 9% non-occupants.
This data is described as 

In 2016, the states with the fewest fatalities due to alcohol-impaired drivers were Utah and Mississippi, with 128 and 52 killed (19%).

Among drivers with BAC levels of 0.08% or higher involved in fatal crashes, 75% are aged between 21 and 44.

Of all motorcyclists killed in crashes, 25% had BACs of 0.08% or greater.

See also 
 Foundation for Advancing Alcohol Responsibility, funded by a group of distillers
 Mothers Against Drunk Driving
 Transportation safety in the United States

References

External links
 Traffic Safety Facts: Alcohol-Impaired Driving, NHTSA
 Drunk Driving Fatalities, Foundation for Advancing Alcohol Responsibility

Transportation in the United States
Traffic
United States crashes